Gintaras "Vytas" Krapikas (born July 6, 1961 in Kretinga, Lithuanian SSR, USSR) is a Lithuanian professional basketball coach and a former international player. He was the head coach for the Nanjing Monkey Kings of the Chinese Basketball Association (CBA). He was a member of the Lithuania national basketball team that won a bronze medal in Barcelona's 1992 Summer Olympics. He currently serves as an assistant coach of Žalgiris Kaunas

Playing career
During the 1980s, while playing for Žalgiris, Krapikas' jersey number was 9, and his position was small forward.

Coaching career
In 2000, Krapikas took a position as assistant basketball coach for Žalgiris Kaunas; together with the head coach, Antanas Sireika, he stepped down from this position in 2006, when the coaching team was re-organized. From 2002 to 2005, he was an assistant coach for the Lithuanian national team. From 2006 until 2008, he was an assistant basketball coach for UNICS Kazan.

In 2008, he was the head coach of Žalgiris Kaunas, to very little success, and on December 18, 2009, he resigned from Žalgiris Kaunas' head coach post. He also coached Nevėžis for a short time in the 2010-2011 season, and was the assistant and head coach for Azovmash in 2011-2012. He returned to UNICS Kazan in 2012. Before the 2013-2014 season, he came back to Žalgiris Kaunas as an assistant coach. He became head coach in April. This time, he was much more success - under Krapikas, Žalgiris played great defence - and had a solid season in the Euroleague in 2014-2015, making the Top16 phase. Žalgiris also won the LKF Cup in 2015, as well as the 2014 and 2015 LKL titles. The team dominated in matches with biggest rival BC Lietuvos rytas. By the 2015-2016 season, however, the magic had worn off - the results were poor, especially in the Euroleague, and Krapikas resigned under much pressure in January, 2016. He was replaced by Šarūnas Jasikevičius.

Awards and achievements
 USSR League Champion - 1985, 1986, 1987
 Intercontinental W. Jones Cup winner - 1986
 Olympic Bronze medalist - 1992
 European championship Silver medalist - 1995

Nickname
Gintaras Krapikas has an old nickname, which appeared during his tenure with Kaunas Žalgiris as a player. The nickname appeared due to his second name "Krapikas", which is a little bit similar to Lithuanian word "Krapai" (English: Dill) and at that time, there was a famous dill farmer, Vytas, from Petrašiūnai.

References

  . Gintaras Krapikas. Lietuvos Krepšinio Lyga.
  . G. Krapikas: „Žalgiris“ – mano gyvenimas. Balsas.lt.

External links
 Coach Profile at EuroLeague.net

1961 births
Living people
Basketball players at the 1992 Summer Olympics
BC Žalgiris players
BC Žalgiris coaches
Lithuanian basketball coaches
Lithuanian expatriate basketball people in China
Lithuanian expatriate basketball people in Russia
Lithuanian expatriate basketball people in Ukraine
Lithuanian men's basketball players
Medalists at the 1992 Summer Olympics
Olympic basketball players of Lithuania
Olympic bronze medalists for Lithuania
Olympic medalists in basketball
Small forwards
Soviet men's basketball players
Sportspeople from Kretinga